Pickavance is an English surname.

The name has been recorded in several spelling forms including Pickance, Pickavance, Pickvance and Pickavant and has pre-medieval origins. It derives from the French phrase 'pricke avant' meaning to spur on, and as such was probably a metonymic or nickname for a messenger or herald, one who was in advance of the main army.

Early examples of the surname recording include:
 Jan Pickedevant, at St. James Church, Clerkenwell, in 1606
 Edward Picavance given as being a farmer of Chester, in 1662
 Simon Prickadvance, in the Hearth tax rolls of the county of Sussex, in 1678

The first recorded spelling of the family name is believed to be that of William Prickeavant, dated 1273, in the Pipe rolls of the county of Bedfordshire, during the reign of Edward I.

The name may refer to:

People:
 Ian Pickavance (born 1968), an English former professional rugby league footballer 
 Norman Pickavance, an advisor, author and activist involved in organisation and societal renewal
 Stephen Pickavance, a British former competitive figure skater
 Thomas Gerald Pickavance (1915–1991), a British nuclear physicist

References

English-language surnames
Surnames of French origin
Occupational surnames